Lee Da-in (born Kim Bo-ram; March 25, 1985) is a South Korean actress. She made her debut in 2007 SBS television series The Person I Love.

Filmography

Television series

Film

References

External links
 on Box Media 

South Korean television actresses
South Korean film actresses
1985 births
Living people
21st-century South Korean actresses
Actresses from Seoul